The 2009 season was the 18th full year of competitive football in the Baltic country as an independent nation. The Estonia national football team played a total number of thirteen matches in 2009, and did not qualify for the 2010 FIFA World Cup in South Africa.

Results

See also
Estonia national football team results (1991–2009)

References
All national team games

2009
2009 national football team results
National